Bachtel is a mountain of the Zurich Oberland, located between Hinwil and Wald in the canton of Zurich. It lies approximately halfway between the Schnebelhorn (the highest point of the canton) and Lake Zurich.

The Bachtel range (also Allmann or Allmen, Bachtel-Allmen-Kette) separates the Töss and Glatt basins. Extending to the north of Bachtel proper, towards Bauma, it includes Auenberg (1050 m), Allmen (1079 m) and Stüssel (1051 m).

References

External links
Bachtel on Hikr

Mountains of the Alps
Mountains of the canton of Zürich
Appenzell Alps